Crypsinus is a monotypic genus of shield bugs in the tribe Graphosomatini, containing the species Crypsinus angustatus.

References

Pentatomidae genera
Podopinae